Bruce Bvuma (born 15 May 1995) is a South African professional soccer player who plays for Kaizer Chiefs and the South Africa national team.

References

1995 births
Living people
South African soccer players
South Africa international soccer players
Association football goalkeepers
Kaizer Chiefs F.C. players
South African Premier Division players